QYK may refer to:

 99.5 QYK or WQYK-FM, a radio station (99.5 FM) licensed to St. Petersburg, Florida, United States
 QYK Brands, an American company